Foxy was a late '70s Latin dance/disco group from Hialeah, Florida.

Career
The group initially consisted of singer and guitarist Ish "Angel" Ledesma, percussionist Richard "Richie" Puente, keyboardist Charlie Murciano, bass guitarist Arnold Paseiro, and drummer Joe Galdo, and (for the first album) co-lead vocalist Gary Ortiz.  Shortly after the first album was issued, Ortiz was replaced by Carlo Driggs, who contributed vocals/percussion and shared songwriting credits on Foxy's second album, Get Off.

Foxy's biggest hit was "Get Off" in 1978 (written by Ledesma and Driggs), which peaked at #9 on the Billboard Hot 100 and #1 on the Soul chart for two weeks. The song was a Dutch #1 smash hit single. It was their only release from the 1978 album Get Off, which was released in 1978. In early 1979, the band (and session musician George Terry) were in Criteria Studios, Miami, where they played on the backing track of ABBA's song "Voulez-Vous", the only time ABBA recorded outside of Sweden.

Driggs left shortly before Foxy's third album was recorded and was not replaced. The group's third album Hot Numbers was released in 1979. The first single, "Hot Number" peaked at #21 on the Billboard Hot 100, and #4 on the Soul chart in 1979.

Keyboardist Charlie Murciano departed the band later in 1979, and the group, now a quartet (with session musicians on keyboards), issued one final album Party Boys before breaking up in 1980.

Ish Ledesma later formed the groups Oxo in 1983 and Company B in 1986, the latter with his wife Lori L., her sister Lezlee Livrano, and Susan Johnson.

In addition to his involvement and writing credits with Foxy, Carlo Driggs was the lead singer of Kracker, which released three albums. Driggs was also the lead singer of Paul Revere & the Raiders for over 20 years (from 1983 till 2004). Driggs died in Miami, Florida on May 31, 2017, of a sudden massive heart attack after playing with his band at home at age 67.

Puente, who died on July 18, 2004, at age 51, was the son of bandleader Tito Puente. A news report on the website allaboutjazz.com said Richard Puente "was hospitalized after suffering from viral encephalopathy, which was the result of a brain injury during a mugging more than 10 years prior. Since his release from the hospital, Richie had been nonverbal, confined to a bed and wheelchair, and relegated to tube feeding. He resided at home with his 95-year-old grandmother and his mother, Ida Carlini."

Discography

Studio albums

Singles

References

American funk musical groups
American disco groups
Musical groups from Florida
1976 establishments in Florida
Musical groups from Miami